This Thing of Ours is an extended play by musician the Alchemist. It was released on April 30, 2021, by ALC Records.

Release and promotion

On April 12, 2021, the Alchemist, Earl Sweatshirt, Navy Blue, Sideshow, Boldy James, Pink Siifu and Maxo all posted on their Instagram accounts the same section of what would later be revealed to be the cover art, with the caption "4/30". The EP was formally announced by Alchemist on April 23, with the release of the single "Nobles" and an accompanying music video.

Upon the digital and physical release of the EP, a VHS tape was also released including all of the songs and music videos each by a different director. The video for "TV Dinners" was released on Alchemist's YouTube channel on April 30. The music videos for "Holy Hell" followed on May 7, 2021, and finally "Loose Change" on May 14.

Track listing 

 All tracks are produced by the Alchemist.

 Notes
 In July 2021, "Nobles" and its instrumental were removed off of music streaming services due to sample clearance issues. That September, an edited version was re-released to services.

This Thing of Ours 2 

On September 28, 2021, the Alchemist announced the sequel EP, This Thing of Ours 2, to be released on October 8. The lead single "Miracle Baby" was released on October 1, with an accompanying music video. A music video for "Lossless" was released alongside the EP on October 8, followed by "Wildstyle" on October 15.

Track listing 

 All tracks are produced by the Alchemist.

References 

2021 EPs
The Alchemist (musician) albums
Albums produced by the Alchemist (musician)